Cerebral salt-wasting syndrome (CSWS), also written cerebral salt wasting syndrome, is a rare endocrine condition featuring a low blood sodium concentration and dehydration in response to injury (trauma) or the presence of tumors in or surrounding the brain. In this condition, the kidney is functioning normally but excreting excessive sodium. The condition was initially described in 1950. Its cause and management remain controversial. In the current literature across several fields, including neurology, neurosurgery, nephrology, and critical care medicine, there is controversy over whether CSWS is a distinct condition, or a special form of syndrome of inappropriate antidiuretic hormone secretion (SIADH).

Signs and symptoms
Signs and symptoms of CSWS include large amounts of urination (polyuria, defined as over three liters of urine output over 24 hours in an adult), high amounts of sodium in the urine, low blood sodium concentration,  excessive thirst (polydipsia), extreme salt cravings, dysfunction of the autonomic nervous system (dysautonomia), and dehydration.  Patients often self-medicate by consuming high amounts of sodium and by dramatically increasing their water intake. Advanced symptoms include muscle cramps, lightheadedness, dizziness or vertigo, feelings of anxiety or panic, increased heart rate or slowed heart rate, low blood pressure and orthostatic hypotension which can result in fainting. Other symptoms frequently associated with dysautonomia include headaches, pallor, malaise, facial flushing, constipation or diarrhea, nausea, acid reflux, visual disturbances, numbness, nerve pain, trouble breathing, chest pain, loss of consciousness, and seizures.

Causes
Although the pathophysiology of CSWS is not fully understood, it is usually caused by neurological injury, most commonly aneurysmal subarachnoid hemorrhage. It is also reported after surgery for pituitary tumor, acoustic neuroma, calvarial remodeling, glioma and with infections including tuberculous meningitis, viral meningitis, metastatic carcinoma, and cranial trauma.

Diagnosis
CSWS is a diagnosis of exclusion and may be difficult to distinguish from the syndrome of inappropriate antidiuretic hormone (SIADH), which develops under similar circumstances and also presents with hyponatremia. The main clinical difference is that of total fluid status of the patient: CSWS leads to a relative or overt low blood volume whereas SIADH is consistent with a normal or high blood volume (due to water reabsorption via the V2 receptor). If blood-sodium levels increase when fluids are restricted, SIADH is more likely. Additionally, urine output is classically low in SIADH and elevated in CSWS.

Treatment
While CSWS usually appears within the first week after brain injury and spontaneously resolves in 2–4 weeks, it can sometimes last for months or years. In contrast to the use of fluid restriction to treat SIADH, CSWS is treated by replacing the urinary losses of water and sodium with hydration and sodium replacement. The mineralocorticoid medication fludrocortisone can also improve the low sodium level.

References

External links 

Endocrine diseases
Electrolyte disturbances
Neurosurgery
Rare syndromes